The Orinoquía region is one of the six natural regions of Colombia that belongs to the Orinoco River watershed. It is also known colloquially as the Eastern Plains from the Spanish Llanos Orientales. The region covers most of the area of the departments of Meta, Arauca, Casanare and Vichada.

Biogeographical subregion
The Orinoquía region has the following subregions:
 Meta River Plain
 Arauca Marshlands
 Serranía de la Macarena

Biodiversity 

The ecosystems of the region are tropical savanna with gallery forests and wetlands along the rivers.

Protected areas

 PNN Serranía de la Macarena
 PNN El Tuparro
 PNN Morichales de Paz de Ariporo

References

Natural regions of Colombia
Llanos